Matthew "Mattie" Coleman (born 4 November 1958) is an Irish retired Gaelic footballer who played as a left corner-back and as a left wing-back with the Galway senior team.

Honours

 Galway
 Connacht Senior Football Championship (5): 1982, 1983, 1984, 1986, 1987

References

1958 births
Living people
Abbeyknockmoy Gaelic footballers
Galway inter-county Gaelic footballers